The Dobi-I was designed by Lithuanian aviator Jurgis Dobkevičius and the first airplane of Lithuanian design. Jurgis Dobkevičius started designing and building Dobi-I in 1921, and it was first tested by its designer in July 1922. The single Dobi-I prototype was damaged beyond repair in an accident on 1 December 1925.

Specifications

See also
Dobi-II
Dobi-III

References

1920s Lithuanian sport aircraft
High-wing aircraft
Single-engined tractor aircraft
Aircraft first flown in 1922
Conventional landing gear